Meridion is a genus of diatoms belonging to the family Fragilariaceae.

The genus has cosmopolitan distribution.

Species:

Meridion alansmithii 
Meridion circulare 
Meridion coccocampyla

References

Fragilariophyceae
Diatom genera